Roy Best was an American illustrator and painter of pin-up girls.

He was born in Waverly, Ohio on December 3, 1892, and attended the Art Institute of Cincinnati, working on a railroad construction crew to support himself. He later enrolled in the Art Institute of Chicago.

Later, Best was represented in New York City by American Artists. During this time he painted several covers for The Saturday Evening Post. By 1931, Best was painting pin-ups for the Joseph C. Hoover & Sons calendar company. That same year, he was commissioned by the Whitman Publishing Company to illustrate The Peter Pan Picture Book, based on J. M. Barrie's play Peter Pan; an illustration from this project was the basis for the Peter Pan Bus Lines logo. He illustrated many other children's books, including "Little Friends from Many Lands" by Mary Windsor (Whitman Publishing Company, 1935). He also painted a number of well-known actresses such as Grace Kelly.

In 1942 Best was commissioned by the Treasury's Section of Painting and Sculpture to paint a post office mural, Arrival of Packet, in his hometown of Waverly, Ohio.  That same year he was hired by Brown and Bigelow leading to a career producing calendar pin-ups.

In later years, he was known for his corporate-commissioned oil portraiture, and watercolor landscapes of Cape Cod, his retirement home.

See also
 List of pinup artists

References
 The Great American Pin-Up, by Charles G. Martignette and Louis K. Meisel,

External links 

 
WARNING: WorldCat (below) mixes works by multiple Roy Bests, as of September 2018

American illustrators
Pin-up artists
People from Waverly, Ohio
Painters from Ohio
20th-century American painters
American male painters
1892 births
Year of death missing
Section of Painting and Sculpture artists
20th-century American male artists